Velshi is a weekend morning news program hosted by Ali Velshi on MSNBC. The program debuted on February 15, 2020. The show displaced Up with David Gura and airs from 8 to 10 a.m. on Saturdays and Sundays.

The new weekend show also coincided with MSNBC's hiring of Alicia Menendez as a weekend anchor.

References

External links
Official website

MSNBC original programming
2020 American television series debuts
English-language television shows